Johnny Sand Meads (born June 25, 1961 in Labadieville, Louisiana) is a former professional American football linebacker in the National Football League for the Houston Oilers from 1984–1992 and Washington Redskins in 1992. Meads was drafted in the third round of the 1984 NFL Draft by the Houston Oilers and was also a third round (56th overall) selection by the New Orleans Breakers in the 1984 USFL Draft.

Meads played college football at Nicholls State University and high school football at Assumption High School in Napoleonville, Louisiana.

References
 Nicholls State Colonels media guide

External links
Nicholls State bio
NFL bio

1961 births
Living people
Players of American football from Louisiana
American football linebackers
Houston Oilers players
Washington Redskins players
Nicholls Colonels football players
People from Assumption Parish, Louisiana